Weide Army Heliport  is a heliport, formerly Weide Army Airfield, located  from Edgewood Arsenal, in the U.S. state of Maryland.

History 
On 25 September 1976, a 40,409 square foot building was dedicated at the airfield. About 70 helicopters were based at the airfield to respond to natural disasters.

In 2013, a 100,000 sq ft addition was dedicated to support six CH-47 parking pads.

See also
Phillips Army Airfield

References

External links 

Airports in Maryland
Airports established in 1941
1941 establishments in Maryland
Transportation buildings and structures in Harford County, Maryland